Bold Park is a  urban bushland area in the suburb of City Beach, in Perth, Western Australia. It is located  directly west of the Perth central business district, its western border less than one kilometre from the Indian Ocean. To the east, Perry Lakes reserve is directly adjacent to the park. The hilly topography allows views of both the city and ocean.

History
The Perth City Council established Bold Park in 1936. It was named after William E. Bold on 14 November 1944, who served as town clerk from 1900 to 1944 (the longest serving town clerk in the council's history).

Bold Park is located on a calcareous coastal plain. Limestone formations in the park were quarried to provide stone for the growing population of Perth. The 640-person-capacity Quarry Amphitheatre uses quarry walls for acoustics and shelter.

Bold Park was recognised as an A-class reserve on 10 August 1998. Since 2000, the Botanic Gardens and Parks Authority (BGPA) has managed Bold Park (along with the 406-hectare Kings Park). Frequent fires, recreational activities and weed invasion have plagued Perth's urban bushland areas. The Bold Park Environmental Management Plan (2000–2005) committed the BGPA to restoring the park.

Bold Park Reservoir is situated on the western edge of the park, off Kalinda Drive.

References

Further reading 
 "Bold Park Changes Hands—Officially", Subiaco Post, 22–23 August 1998, p. 76

Parks in Perth, Western Australia
Town of Cambridge
1936 establishments in Australia